Brit Stav (born 1944) is a Norwegian archer. She was born in Selbu. She competed in archery at the 1972 Summer Olympics in Munich, where she placed 40th in the women's individual contest.

References

External links

1944 births
Living people
People from Selbu
Norwegian female archers
Olympic archers of Norway
Archers at the 1972 Summer Olympics
Sportspeople from Trøndelag